Kuojtakiloyan is a Masehual term that means 'useful forest' or 'forest that produces', and it is an agroforestry system developed and maintained by indigenous peoples of the Sierra Norte of the State of Puebla, Mexico. It has become a vital fountain of resources (food, medicinal herbs, fuels, floriculture, etc.) for the local population, but it is also a respectful transformation of the environment, with its biodiversity and nature conservation. The kuojtakiloyan comes directly from the ancestral Nahua and Totonaku knowledge of their natural environment. Despite its unawareness among the mainstream Mexican population, many agronomic experts in the world point it out as a successful case of sustainable agroforestry practiced communally.

The kuojtakiloyan is a jungle-landscaped polyculture in which avocados, sweet potatoes, cinnamon, black cherries, chalahuits, citrus fruits, gourds, macadamia, mangoes, bananas and sapotes are grown. In addition, a wide variety of harvested wild edible mushrooms and herbs (quelites). The jonote is planted because its fiber is useful in basketry, and also bamboo, which is fast growing, to build cabins and other structures. Concurrently to kuojtakiloyan, shade coffee is grown (café bajo sombra in Spanish; kafentaj in Masehual). Shade is essential to obtain high quality coffee. The local population has favored the proliferation of the stingless bee (pisilnekemej) by including the plants that it pollinates. From bees, they get honey, pollen, wax and propolis.

References 

Artificial ecosystems
Agriculture in Mesoamerica
Agroforestry systems